David Lowrey Seymour (December 2, 1803, Wethersfield, Connecticut – October 11, 1867, Lanesborough, Massachusetts) was an American lawyer and politician from New York. From 1843 to 1845, he served one term in the U.S. House of Representatives, then served a second, non-consecutive term from 1851 to 1853.

Life
He graduated from Yale College in 1826, and was a tutor at Yale College from 1828 to 1830. Then he studied law, was admitted to the bar in 1829, and commenced practice in Troy, New York.

Political career 
He was a member of the New York State Assembly in 1836.

He was District Attorney of Rensselaer County from 1839 to 1842.

Congress 
Seymour was elected as a Democrat to the 28th United States Congress, holding office from March 4, 1843, to March 3, 1845, and was Chairman of the Committee on Revolutionary Pensions.

Seymour was elected to the 32nd United States Congress, holding office from March 4, 1851, to March 3, 1853, and was Chairman of the Committee on Commerce. Afterwards, he resumed the practice of law.

He was a delegate to the New York State Constitutional Convention of 1867.

Death and burial 
He died on October 11, 1868 and was buried at Mount Ida Cemetery in Troy.

Family 
His law partner and son-in-law Charles E. Patterson was Speaker of the New York State Assembly in 1882.

Sources

1803 births
1867 deaths
Yale College alumni
Democratic Party members of the New York State Assembly
Democratic Party members of the United States House of Representatives from New York (state)
19th-century American politicians